The 1985–1986 Highland Football League featured 17 teams.

It was won by Forres Mechanics for the first time, ahead of Elgin City.

Teams

Table

References

Highland Football League seasons
Highland